Brian Stewart may refer to:

 Brian Stewart (phlebotomist) (born 1966), American phlebotomist, convicted for injecting son with HIV
 Brian Stewart (journalist) (born 1942), Canadian journalist
 Brian Stewart (American football) (born 1964), defensive coordinator
 Brian Edward Stewart, former British Ambassador to Algeria
 Brian W. Stewart (born 1957), member of the Illinois General Assembly for the 89th district
 Brian Stewart (diplomat) (1922–2015), Scottish soldier, colonial official and diplomat
 Brian Stewart (playwright), British playwright
 Brian Stewart (archaeologist) (born 1978), anthropological archaeologist
 Brian Stewart (politician), Ohio state representative

See also
 Bryan Stewart (born 1985), footballer